Alfredo Fernández-Durán Moreno (born 2 February 1964) is a Spanish equestrian. He competed in the team jumping event at the 1988 Summer Olympics.

References

External links
 

1964 births
Living people
Spanish male equestrians
Olympic equestrians of Spain
Equestrians at the 1988 Summer Olympics
Sportspeople from Madrid